Newholm-cum-Dunsley is a civil parish in the Scarborough district of North Yorkshire, England.

According to the 2011 UK census, Newholm-cum-Dunsley parish had a population of 192, a decrease on the 2001 UK census figure of 213.

References

External links

Civil parishes in North Yorkshire